Wales has seven cities as of September 2022. Bangor is Wales' oldest cathedral city, whereas St Davids is the smallest city in the United Kingdom. Cardiff is the capital city of Wales and its most-populous, followed by Swansea the second most-populous. Since 2000, Welsh towns have submitted bids to be awarded city status as part of jubilees of the reigning British monarch or for other events, such as the millennium celebrations, with Newport, St Asaph and Wrexham awarded city status through these contests. Wrexham is the newest to hold the status, being awarded it in September 2022 as part of the Platinum Jubilee Civic Honours of Queen Elizabeth II.

List of Welsh cities

City bids 
Since 2000, Welsh towns have competed in a contest to be awarded city status, as part of civic honours in notable celebrations, like the millennium celebrations or the Jubilee of the reigning monarch. The 2000 contest was criticised for having no Welsh bid be successful.

Successful 

Newport  — 2000 (lost); 2002 (won)
 St Asaph — 2000 (lost); 2002 (lost); 2012 (won)
 Wrexham — 2000 (lost); 2002 (lost); 2012 (lost); 2022 (won)

Unsuccessful 
 Aberystwyth — 2000 (lost); 2002 (lost)
 Machynlleth — 2000 (lost); 2002 (lost)
 Newtown — 2000 (lost); 2002 (lost)
Merthyr Tydfil councillors voted against a proposal to bid for city status for 2022 which followed feedback.

See also
List of built-up areas in Wales by population
List of towns in Wales
List of cathedrals in Wales

References 

Geography of Wales